Keysville is a town in Burke and Jefferson counties in the U.S. state of Georgia.  As of the 2020 census, the city's population was 300.

History
The Georgia General Assembly incorporated Keysville as a town in 1890.

Geography

Demographics

As of the 2010 United States Census, there were 332 people living in the city. The racial makeup of the city was 55.1% Black, 37.7% White, 1.8% Asian and 1.8% from two or more races. 3.6% were Hispanic or Latino of any race.

As of the census of 2000, there were 180 people, 45 households, and 35 families living in the city. The racial makeup of the city was 62.22% African American, 33.89% White,  0.56% from other races, and 3.33% from two or more races. Hispanic or Latino of any race were 1.67% of the population.

There were 45 households, out of which 31.1% had children under the age of 18 living with them, 37.8% were married couples living together, 31.1% had a female householder with no husband present, and 22.2% were non-families. 17.8% of all households were made up of individuals, and 11.1% had someone living alone who was 65 years of age or older.  The average household size was 2.67 and the average family size was 3.00.

In the city, the population was spread out, with 18.9% under the age of 18, 5.0% from 18 to 24, 18.9% from 25 to 44, 17.8% from 45 to 64, and 39.4% who were 65 years of age or older.  The median age was 50 years. For every 100 females, there were 52.5 males.  For every 100 females age 18 and over, there were 47.5 males.

The median income for a household in the city was $21,167, and the median income for a family was $21,324. Males had a median income of $20,833 versus $14,063 for females. The per capita income for the town was $7,970.  About 45.2% of families and 61.1% of the population were below the poverty line, including 65.6% of those under the age of eighteen and 68.9% of those 65 or over.
According to the 2020 census,the population was 300.  Of this, 53.63% were Black or African American, 37.95% were White, 2.11% were two or more races, 1.81% were Asian, and 1.51% were some other race.  3.61% were Hispanic or Latino (of any race)

See also

Central Savannah River Area

References

External links
City of Keysville official website

 

Cities in Burke County, Georgia
Cities in Jefferson County, Georgia
Cities in Georgia (U.S. state)
Augusta metropolitan area